Aquarius is a home computer designed by Radofin and released by Mattel Electronics in 1983. Based on the Zilog Z80 microprocessor, the system has a rubber chiclet keyboard, 4K of RAM, and a subset of Microsoft BASIC in ROM. It connects to a television set for audiovisual output, and uses a cassette tape recorder for secondary data storage. A limited number of peripherals, such as a 40-column thermal printer, a 4-color printer/plotter, and a 300 baud modem, were released. The Aquarius was discontinued in October 1983, only a few months after it was launched.

Development

Looking to compete in the home computer market, Mattel Electronics turned to Radofin, the Hong Kong based manufacturer of their Intellivision consoles. Radofin had designed two computer systems. Internally they were known as "Checkers" and the more sophisticated "Chess". Mattel contracted for these to become the Aquarius and Aquarius II, respectively. Aquarius was announced in 1982 and finally released in June 1983, at a price of $160. Production ceased four months later because of poor sales. Mattel paid Radofin to take back the marketing rights. Four other companies: CEZAR Industries, CRIMAC, New Era Incentives, and Bentley Industries also marketed the unit and accessories.

The Aquarius was often bundled with the Mini-Expander peripheral, which added game pads, an additional cartridge port for memory expansion, and the General Instrument AY-3-8910 sound chip. Other  peripherals were the Data recorder, 40 column thermal printer, 4K and 16K ram carts. Less common first party peripherals include a 300 baud cartridge modem, 32k RAM cart, 4 color plotter, and Quick Disk drive.

Reception

Although less expensive than the TI-99/4A and VIC-20, the Aquarius had comparatively weak graphics and limited memory. Internally, Mattel programmers adopted Bob Del Principe's mock slogan, "Aquarius -a system for the seventies". Of the 32 software titles Mattel announced for the unit, only 21 were released, most of which were ports of Intellivision games. Because of the hardware limitations of the Aquarius, the quality of many games suffered. There was such a lack of programmable graphics that Mattel added a special character set, so the games could at least use character graphics.

As a magazine of the time put it, "The Aquarius suffered one of the shortest lifespans of any computer—it was discontinued by Mattel almost as soon as it hit store shelves, a victim of the 1983 home computer price wars."  Just after the release of the Aquarius, Mattel announced plans for the Aquarius II, and there is evidence that the Aquarius II reached the market in small numbers, but was also not a commercial success.

Technical specifications

 CPU: Zilog Z80 @ 3.5 MHz
 Memory: 4K RAM, expandable to 36K RAM; 8K ROM
 Keyboard: 48-key rubber chiclet keyboard
 Display: TEA1002 chip, generating 320 x 192 pixels (all available within borders),  40x24 text (with a 25th "zero" row at top) formatted in 8x8 pixel character blocks, 80x72 addressable graphics, 16 colors
 Sound: One voice, expandable to four voices
 Ports: Television, cartridge/expansion, tape recorder, printer
 PSU: Non-removable external power supply hard-wired into case providing 8.8 / 16 / -19 VDC

Interfacing

The Aquarius manual did not contain details of any of the ports available. The cassette port, although using the same 5-Pin DIN 41524 connector as the TRS-80, did not have the same pin out and thus was incompatible with readily available cables for the TRS-80, even though they physically fit the sockets on both the computer and cassette player. The Aquarius branded cassette deck came with the appropriate cable.

The cassette port a 5-pin female DIN 41524 connector  

The MIC and EAR connections from the Aquarius each go to the tip/center of one of the two mini-plugs being attached to the recorder; Ground goes to the base/outside of both mini-plugs.

The printer interface is a mini-stereo socket with 3 lines, the same as on the Mattel Entertainment Computer System.  The Aquarius printers came with their own cables.  The interface conforms to RS-232 serial signal standards  (+12VDC/-12VDC), with the knowledge of the pinout it is possible to interface printers with a corresponding RS-232 interface.  The serial is fixed to 1200 baud 8N2 and provided both carriage return and line feed commands to the printer, thus the printer needed to be set to not auto feed with carriage return.

Pin out for the connector on the Aquarius:

Typical serial printers had DB-25 interfaces; some had DE-9 interfaces; and, some Radio Shack (RS) printers had round 4-pin female DIN connector serial interfaces (with the pin sockets numbered left-to-right: 4, 3, 2, 1).   The proper cable for connecting such a printer is as follows:

 MINI-STEREO PLUG      DB-25    DE-9     RS       FUNCTION

 Tip/Center of Plug    Pin 3    Pin 2    Pin 4    Data to Printer
 Middle of Plug        Pin 20   Pin 4    Pin 2    Printer Busy/Ready 
 Base/Outside          Pin 7    Pin 5    Pin 3    Signal Ground

Character set 
The following table shows the Mattel Aquarius character set. Each character is shown with a potential Unicode equivalent if available.

List of games

References

External links

 http://www.vdSteenoven.com/aquarius/
 http://oldcomputers.net/aquarius.html
 http://www.zophar.net/aquarius/
 The Dot Eaters entry on Aquarius and the Intellivision
 Sample videos of most Mattel Aquarius programs
 The Mattel Aquarius at The Centre for Computing History
 Mattel Aquarius Software Collection playable for free in the browser at the Internet Archive

Mattel
Z80-based home computers
Home computers
Computer-related introductions in 1983
Character sets